Wilson Enrique Contreras Trujillo (born 5 October 1967) is a former Chilean footballer who played for clubs like Colo-Colo, Huachipato or Deportes La Serena. 

He played as a midfielder.

Honours

Club
Colo-Colo
 Primera División de Chile (1): 1998

References
 Profile at BDFA 
 

1967 births
Living people
People from Vallenar
Chilean footballers
Chile international footballers
Regional Atacama footballers
Colo-Colo footballers
C.D. Huachipato footballers
Coquimbo Unido footballers
Deportes La Serena footballers
Primera B de Chile players
Chilean Primera División players
Association football midfielders